The 1929–30 season was the 28th season of competitive football in Italy. This was the first season that the Italian Football Championship was revised from having regional and interregional rounds, to a single-tier round-robin format league.

National team

Italy national football team

Friendlies

1927–30 Central European International Cup

League season

Serie A

Serie B

Prima Divisione

Group A (Northern)

Group B (Northern)

Group C (Northern)

Southern

National final

Udinese is crowned national champion of Prima Divisione.

References

 
Seasons in Italian football
1929 in Italian sport
1930 in Italian sport
Italy
Italy